The heats for the women's 50 m backstroke race at the 2009 World Championships took place in the morning and evening of 29 July, with the final in the evening session of 30 July at the Foro Italico in Rome, Italy.

Records
Prior to this competition, the existing world and competition records were as follows:

The following records were established during the competition:

* Championships record split from the 100 m backstroke

Results

Heats

Semifinals

Final

See also
Swimming at the 2007 World Aquatics Championships – Women's 50 metre backstroke

References

External links
Heats Results
Semifinals Results
Final Results

Backstroke Women's 50 m
2009 in women's swimming